is a former Japanese football player.

Club career
Suzuki was born in Tokyo on November 16, 1976. After graduating from high school, he joined JEF United Ichihara with Takayuki Chano in 1995. He played many matches from first season. However his opportunity to play decreased and he moved to Kyoto Purple Sanga in 2001. He played many matches and the club won 2002 Emperor's Cup their first major title. In 2006, he could hardly play in the match and moved to Mito HollyHock in 2007. He retired end of 2009 season.

National team career
In August 1993, Suzuki was selected Japan U-17 national team for 1993 U-17 World Championship. He played full time in all 4 matches. In April 1995, he was also selected Japan U-20 national team for 1995 World Youth Championship and he played all 4 matches as left defender of three back defense.

Club statistics

National team
1993 FIFA U-17 World Championship
1995 FIFA World Youth Championship

References

External links

1976 births
Living people
Association football people from Tokyo
Japanese footballers
Japan youth international footballers
J1 League players
J2 League players
JEF United Chiba players
Kyoto Sanga FC players
Mito HollyHock players
Association football defenders